Ad Dekkers may refer to:
 Ad Dekkers (painter) (1922–2004), Dutch painter
 Ad Dekkers (artist) (1938–1974), Dutch sculptor
 Ad Dekkers (cyclist) (b. 1953), Dutch cyclist